Marie-Daniel Dadiet (born 9 September 1952 in Bolilié, Ivory Coast) is an Ivorian clergyman and emeritus Roman Catholic Archbishop of Korhogo.

Life 
Marie-Daniel Dadiet was ordained a priest on 8 July 1979.

He was appointed titular bishop of Sitipa and auxiliary bishop of Korhogo on 22 May 1998 by Pope John Paul II. His consecrators were the Archbishop of Korhogo, Auguste Nobou,  Maurice Konan Kouassi, Bishop of Odienné, and Jean-Marie Kélétigui, Bishop of Katiola.

The Pope appointed him Bishop of Katiola on 10 October 2002. He was appointed the second Archbishop of Kohrogo on 12 May 2004.

Pope Francis accepted his early resignation on 12 October 2017.

References 

Roman Catholic archbishops of Korhogo
1952 births
Roman Catholic bishops of Katiola
Ivorian Roman Catholic archbishops
Roman Catholic titular bishops of Sitipa
Living people